In mathematics, the notion of being compactly embedded expresses the idea that one set or space is "well contained" inside another. There are versions of this concept appropriate to general topology and functional analysis.

Definition (topological spaces)

Let (X, T) be a topological space, and let V and W be subsets of X. We say that V is compactly embedded in W, and write V ⊂⊂ W, if
 V ⊆ Cl(V) ⊆ Int(W), where Cl(V) denotes the closure of V, and Int(W) denotes the interior of W; and
 Cl(V) is compact.

Definition (normed spaces)

Let X and Y be two normed vector spaces with norms ||•||X and ||•||Y respectively, and suppose that X ⊆ Y. We say that X is compactly embedded in Y, and write X ⊂⊂ Y, if
 X is continuously embedded in Y; i.e., there is a constant C such that ||x||Y ≤ C||x||X for all x in X; and
 The embedding of X into Y is a compact operator: any bounded set in X is totally bounded in Y, i.e. every sequence in such a bounded set has a subsequence that is Cauchy in the norm ||•||Y.

If Y is a Banach space, an equivalent definition is that the embedding operator (the identity) i : X → Y is a compact operator.

When applied to functional analysis, this version of compact embedding is usually used with Banach spaces of functions. Several of the Sobolev embedding theorems are compact embedding theorems. When an embedding is not compact, it may possess a related, but weaker, property of cocompactness.

References

 .
 .
 .

Compactness (mathematics)
Functional analysis
General topology